Creek Street is a historic area of Ketchikan, Alaska.  The street is actually a boardwalk mounted in stilts on a high slope on the east side of Ketchikan Creek, east of the city's downtown. Creek Street was listed on the National Register of Historic Places in 2014.

Description and history
Creek Street is infamous as being Ketchikan's red light district, roughly between 1903 and 1954, and some of its attractions are commemorations of this past.  Its origins lie in a 1903 city ordinance banishing brothels from the city center to the "Indian Town" area on the east side of the creek, and it operated until the brothels were outlawed and shut down in 1954.  Numerous houses of prostitution sprang up on this difficult terrain, supported by wooden stilts.  Famous among them is The Star, which was one of the largest of these businesses, and Dolly's House, which is now a museum.  Winding into the hills above Creek Street is Married Man's Way, a trail used by patrons of the brothels to escape raids.

See also
National Register of Historic Places listings in Ketchikan Gateway Borough, Alaska

References

External links

 Creek Street Photo Gallery

Historic districts on the National Register of Historic Places in Alaska
Historical red-light districts in the United States
Ketchikan, Alaska
National Register of Historic Places in Ketchikan Gateway Borough, Alaska